Karlobag is a seaside municipality on the Adriatic coast in Croatia, located underneath the Velebit mountains overlooking the island of Pag, west of Gospić and south of Senj. The Gacka river also runs through the area. The population of the municipality is 917, with Croats making up the majority at 94.33%, and with 468 people living in the settlement of Karlobag (2011 census).

Today, chief occupations are fishing and tourism. Main activities include boating and hiking, as Karlobag is known for its excellent trails. The Velebit mountains rising above Karlobag have been declared the a world biosphere reserve, currently the only one in Croatia.

History

The town of Karlobag is first mentioned in 1387, as "Bag", founded by the Holy Roman Emperor Charles IV, Holy Roman Emperor in the 14th century, and is thus named after him (Karlo being the Croatian variant of Charles.) It has such strong connections with the interior that its town centre is completely different from other Mediterranean settlements.

Pliny and Ptolemy mentioned it as the Roman "Vegia". During migration period Vegia collapsed, but in the 7th century the Croats built a new settlement to the west of the Roman town, called Skrisa (Opidum Scrissi) which was later known as Bag, the seat of the noble Tugomirić family, then of Gusić-Kurjaković and Mogorović-Disislavić families.

The Turkish invasion of Lika completely changed the course of this town's development. In 1525 it was completely destroyed by the Turks, leaving only a fortress with a small military presence. While Venice was considering whether to completely abandon or rebuild the town, the people of Senj turned to the Austrian Archduke Karl (the founder of the "Vojna Krajina", the military border area) and he built a new town in 1579, which, from 1580 on became known as Karlobag. However, just as the town had been restored (1592) the Venetians took over the fortress and destroyed the town. Right up until 1683 Karlobag was inhabited only by military units.

Another Habsburg ruler (also called Karl) was responsible for Karlobag's further development, the last male member of the family and father of Maria Theresa, Charles VI. His interest in this town was the result of his so-called "Adriatic orientation", for before him Austria had shown little interest in the Adriatic. He has a harbour built and planned a road to Gospić. His grandson Joseph II joined Karlobag to the "Vojna Krajina" in 1776 and in 1786 built another road over Velebit. During Napoleon's rule, Karlobag also suffered shelling from English warships, in 1813.

Until 1918, Karlobag (named CARLOBAGO before 1850, later KARLOPAGO) was part of the (Kingdom of Croatia-Slavonia after the compromise of 1867), in the Croatian Military Frontier, Likaner Regiment  N°I.

Landmarks

The town itself has several historical landmarks, especially the 1713 Capuchin Monastery which has many old paintings, the most important monument of culture in the town. A small exhibition of ecclesiastical art, an archive and a library is arranged in the monastery. Also other churches, most dating back to the 17th and 18th centuries. On the hill above town are the ruins of a Middle Ages fortress called Fortica, and the baroque church of Saint Charles of Borromeo (1776), built on the site of a church of 1615.

The town is also home to a monument to the Croatian linguist Šime Starčević.

See also
 Zadar
 Starigrad

References

External links

 

Municipalities of Croatia
Populated places in Lika-Senj County